Macrostemum is a genus of netspinning caddisflies in the family Hydropsychidae. There are at least 90 described species in Macrostemum.

Species
These 98 species belong to the genus Macrostemum:

 Macrostemum adpictum (Navas, 1934) i c g
 Macrostemum albardanum (Banks, 1931) i c g
 Macrostemum alienum (Ulmer, 1907) i c g
 Macrostemum arcuatum (Erichson, 1848) i c g
 Macrostemum auriferum Neboiss, 1984 i c g
 Macrostemum austrovicinorum Mey, 1989 i c g
 Macrostemum bellerophon Malicky & Chantaramongkol in Malicky, 1998 i c g
 Macrostemum bellum (Banks, 1916) i c g
 Macrostemum bifenestratum (Navas, 1929) i c g
 Macrostemum boettcheri (Ulmer, 1930) i c g
 Macrostemum bouvieri (Navas, 1923) i c g
 Macrostemum brasiliense (Fischer, 1970) i c g
 Macrostemum braueri (Banks, 1924) i c g
 Macrostemum bravoii g
 Macrostemum brisi (Navás, 1930) i c g
 Macrostemum caliptera (Banks, 1931) i c g
 Macrostemum capense (Walker, 1852) i c g
 Macrostemum carolina (Banks, 1909) i c g b
 Macrostemum centrotum (Navas, 1917) i c g
 Macrostemum ciliatum (Ulmer, 1926) i c g
 Macrostemum croceum (Navas, 1924) i c g
 Macrostemum dairiana Malicky, 1998 i c g
 Macrostemum diagramma (McLachlan, 1871) i c g
 Macrostemum digramma McLachlan, 1871 g
 Macrostemum dione Malicky & Chantaramongkol in Malicky, 1998 i c g
 Macrostemum distinctum (Ulmer, 1912) i c g
 Macrostemum distinguendum (Ulmer, 1905) i c g
 Macrostemum dohrni (Ulmer, 1905) i c
 Macrostemum dulce (McLachlan, 1866) i c g
 Macrostemum eleanora (Banks, 1938) i c g
 Macrostemum elegans (Ulmer, 1926) i c g
 Macrostemum erichsoni (Banks, 1920) i c g
 Macrostemum erigone Malicky, 1998 i c g
 Macrostemum ethelda (Banks, 1939) i c g
 Macrostemum fastosum (Walker, 1852) i c g
 Macrostemum fenestratum (Albarda in Veth, 1881) i c g
 Macrostemum floridum (Navas, 1929) i c g
 Macrostemum formosicolum (Matsumura, 1931) i c g
 Macrostemum fulvescens (Martynov, 1935) i c g
 Macrostemum fuscum (Martynov, 1935) i c g
 Macrostemum giganteum (Martynov, 1935) i c g
 Macrostemum gigapunctatus Li & Tian, 1990 i c g
 Macrostemum graphicum (Navas, 1934) i c g
 Macrostemum hestia Malicky & Chantaramongkol in Malicky, 1998 i c g
 Macrostemum hospitum (McLachlan, 1862) i c g
 Macrostemum hyalinum (Pictet, 1836) i c g
 Macrostemum indistinctum (Banks, 1911) i c g
 Macrostemum inscriptum (Walker, 1852) i c g
 Macrostemum lacroixi (Navas, 1923) i c g
 Macrostemum lautum (McLachlan, 1862) i c g
 Macrostemum loriai (Navás, 1930) i c g
 Macrostemum luteipes (Kimmins, 1955) i c g
 Macrostemum madagascariense (Ulmer, 1905) i c
 Macrostemum marpessa Malicky, 1998 i c g
 Macrostemum midas Malicky & Chantaramongkol in Malicky, 1998 i c g
 Macrostemum multifarium (Walker, 1852) i c g
 Macrostemum nebulosum (Hagen, 1858) i c g
 Macrostemum negrense Flint, 1978 i c g
 Macrostemum nigrum g
 Macrostemum obliquum (Hagen, 1858) i c g
 Macrostemum obscurum (Banks, 1920) i c g
 Macrostemum okinawanum (Matsumura, 1931) i c g
 Macrostemum opulentum (Ulmer, 1905) i c g
 Macrostemum pallidipennis (Martynov, 1935) i c
 Macrostemum pallipes (Banks, 1931) i c g
 Macrostemum par (Navás, 1930) i c g
 Macrostemum paradiatum Li & Tian, 1991 i c g
 Macrostemum placidum (Navas, 1935) i c g
 Macrostemum pseudodistinctum (Marlier, 1965) i c g
 Macrostemum pseudoneura (Brauer, 1865) i c g
 Macrostemum pulcherrimum (Walker, 1852) i c g
 Macrostemum punctatum (Betten, 1909) i c g
 Macrostemum quinquefasciatum (Martynov, 1935) i c g
 Macrostemum quinquepunctatum (Matsumura, 1931) i c g
 Macrostemum radiatum (McLachlan, 1872) i c g
 Macrostemum santaeritae (Ulmer, 1905) i c g
 Macrostemum saowapa Chantaramongkol & Malicky, 1986 i c g
 Macrostemum saundersii (McLachlan, 1866) i c g
 Macrostemum scriptum (Rambur, 1842) i c g
 Macrostemum sepultum (Hagen, 1859) i c g
 Macrostemum similior (Banks, 1931) i c g
 Macrostemum spectabilis (Banks, 1931) i c g
 Macrostemum splendens (Banks, 1931) i c g
 Macrostemum splendidum (Hagen, 1858) i c g
 Macrostemum subaequale (Banks, 1920) i c g
 Macrostemum surinamense (Flint, 1974) i c g
 Macrostemum thomasi Mey, 1993 i c g
 Macrostemum tonkinensis (Mosely, 1934) i c g
 Macrostemum transversum (Walker, 1852) i c g
 Macrostemum trifasciatum (Banks, 1934) i c g
 Macrostemum trigramma (Navas, 1916) i c g
 Macrostemum trilineatum (Jacquemart, 1961) i c g
 Macrostemum triste (Navas, 1916) i c g
 Macrostemum tuberosum (Ulmer, 1905) i c g
 Macrostemum ulmeri (Banks, 1913) i c
 Macrostemum uncatum Li & Tian, 1991 i c g
 Macrostemum wallacei (McLachlan, 1866) i c g
 Macrostemum zebratum (Hagen, 1861) i c g b (zebra caddisfly)

Data sources: i=ITIS, c=Catalogue of Life, g=GBIF, b=Bugguide.net

References

Further reading

External links

 

Trichoptera genera
Articles created by Qbugbot